Michael Marcus (9 November 1894 – November 1960) was a Scottish Labour Party politician.

Marcus was educated at George Heriot's School and the University of Edinburgh before becoming a solicitor.

He was elected at the 1929 general election as one of the two Members of Parliament for Dundee, but was defeated at the 1931 general election. He stood again in  1935, but was unsuccessful.  Instead, he focused on his legal career, becoming a barrister with Middle Temple.

References

External links 
 

1894 births
1960 deaths
Alumni of the University of Edinburgh
Scottish barristers
Scottish Labour MPs
Members of the Parliament of the United Kingdom for Dundee constituencies
People educated at George Heriot's School
UK MPs 1929–1931
National Labour (UK) politicians

Jewish politicians